"Why You Treat Me So Bad" is a song by Jamaican-American reggae musician Shaggy featuring American rapper and emcee Grand Puba. It was released in 1995 as the second single from his third studio album, Boombastic (1995), and contains elements from "Mr. Brown" by Bob Marley. It was a notable hit in several countries, including Ireland, Italy, the Netherlands, New Zealand, and the UK, where it peaked at number 11.

Critical reception
Larry Flick from Billboard commented in his review of the single, "As astute programmers have known for some time, there is way more to Shaggy than his top 10 hit "Boombastic". Fun and fresh changes in tempo and the distinctive vocal styles of Shaggy and Grand Puba complement one another. Get up and play it." Another editor, Paul Verna, remarked that the song benefits from Puba's "off-kilter musings, buzzes madly and bounces like aural Jello". Chuck Campbell from Knoxville News Sentinel viewed it as "nasty fun for those who can get past the misogyny." In his weekly UK chart commentary in Dotmusic, James Masterton said, "It will probably struggle to become as big a hit as his past few efforts, featuring less of the humour that made "Boombastic" such a commercial hit." 

Heidi Siegmund Cuda from Los Angeles Times felt that Shaggy "rounds out" his reggae repertoire with "such likable dance-hall treats", as the "lovelorn" "Why You Treat Me So Bad?". A reviewer from Music Week wrote, "Mr Boombastic returns with a mid-tempo hip hop swayer with a jazzy swingtime flavour and a cameo from New York rapper Grand Puba. It's more laid back than his last release and should give Shaggy another hit." James Hamilton from the RM Dance Update declared it as a "'Why must you treat me so bad?' girls pushed terrific funky ragga rap jolter". Al Weisel of Rolling Stone found that the "funky grind" of the song "demonstrate an equal fluency in contemporary mainland rhythm."

Track listings

 US CD single 1 (1995)
 "Why You Treat Me So Bad" (radio mix)
 "Why You Treat Me So Bad" (club mix)
 "The Train Is Coming" (film version featuring Ken Boothe)
 "Demand the Ride"

 US CD single 2 (1995)
 "Why You Treat Me So Bad" (Salaam clean radio remix) — 4:19
 "Why You Treat Me So Bad" (Sting radio remix) — 4:04
 "Demand the Ride" — 4:00
 "Big Up" (featuring Rayvon) — 3:36

 US cassette single (1995)
 "Why You Treat Me So Bad" (radio mix) — 3:51
 "Why You Treat Me So Bad" (club mix) — 3:53

 UK and Australasian CD single (1996)
 "Why You Treat Me So Bad" (radio mix)
 "Why You Treat Me So Bad" (Soul Inside mix)
 "Why You Treat Me So Bad" (club mix)
 "Why You Treat Me So Bad" (LP version)

 UK cassette single (1996) and European CD single (1995)
 "Why You Treat Me So Bad" (radio mix)
 "Why You Treat Me So Bad" (Soul Inside mix)

Charts

Release history

References

1995 singles
1995 songs
Shaggy (musician) songs
Songs written by Shaggy (musician)
Virgin Records singles